Philip Michael Lindholm (December 10) is an American writer, singer-songwriter, filmmaker, and academic from Seattle, Washington, United States.  He is best known as the author of Latter-day Dissent and for playing the lead role in the BBC's murder mystery Who Murdered Warren Taylor, presenting ITV1's The Grail Trail: In Pursuit of the Da Vinci Code, creating and researching ITV1's The Muslim Jesus, and as the lead singer-songwriter for Whiskey N' Rye.  In 2019, Lindholm gave a TEDx talk entitled "The Secret to a Meaningful Life."

Biography

Early life and university
Dr. Lindholm grew up just outside Seattle.  Lindholm left high school and began attending Green River Community College at the age of 17.  After receiving an AA degree, Lindholm went on to achieve high honors from Central Washington University in "Philosophy" and "Philology and Exegesis," and was named State Finalist for the Rhodes Scholarship in his senior year. Lindholm was subsequently offered a place at both Harvard and Oxford universities for graduate study, and accepted a full scholarship to the latter.

Lindholm received three master's degrees in Jewish Studies, Christian Theology, and Islamic Studies, and graduated with a doctorate in philosophical theology from Oxford in 2010.  During his graduate study, Lindholm complemented time at Oxford with research at other institutions, including a tenure as visiting scholar in Levinasian studies at L'École Normale Supérieure in Paris in 2005, and a student of music composition at Juilliard in New York in 2006 and 2007.

Music
After studying at Juilliard in 2006–7, Lindholm toured as a singer-songwriter in England and Paris, and from America's West Coast to its East.  He has since put together a band, Whiskey N' Rye and released two albums.

Film
Lindholm studied acting under Amy Werba and Charles Weinstein in Paris in 2005.  His debut was in the lead role of the BBC's murder mystery "Who Murdered Warren Taylor" in 2005, and he then appeared in a series of independent films in London, including "Pieces," where he met filmmaker Sean Corbett and joined the sponsoring production company, 24/30 Cinema. Subsequently, while Lindholm lived in Queens, NY between 2006 and 2007, he started working with documentary filmmaker Albert Maysles, which segued into further projects with ITV and BBC in 2008-9 and an acting role in Larry Holden's independent film "All Sun and Little White Flowers" that summer.  While at ITV, Lindholm created and helped produce the documentary The Muslim Jesus, which was released to wide acclaim.

Selected filmography

Academics
Lindholm is a Kierkegaard scholar and former lecturer in comparative religion at the universities of Washington and Oxford who speaks around the world on philosophical and theological topics. His recent books include Latter-day Dissent, which analyzes the nature and extent of intellectual freedom and disciplinary action in the LDS Church, and Voyeur: Notes of Disquiet, a collection of aphorisms.

Selected works
 Voyeur: Notes of Disquiet (2012) 
 Latter-day Dissent (2011) 
 Metallica and Philosophy" chapter: "The Struggle Within: Hetfield, Kierkegaard, and the Pursuit of Authenticity (2007) 
 Poker and Philosophy" chapter: "Jewish Philosophy Wins the Pot: How Stu Ungar and Emmanuel Levinas Coralled the Texans (2006)

References

External links
 
 

Living people
Year of birth missing (living people)
American male film actors
American documentary film producers
American male singer-songwriters
American singer-songwriters
Filmmakers from Seattle
Writers from Seattle
Film producers from Washington (state)